Aase Simonsen (born 1 July 1962) is a Norwegian politician for the Conservative Party.

She served as a deputy representative to the Parliament of Norway from Rogaland during the term 2017–2021.

She has been an elected member of Rogaland county council and from 2011 to 2015 the mayor of Karmøy.

References

1962 births
Living people
People from Karmøy
Mayors of places in Rogaland
Deputy members of the Storting
Conservative Party (Norway) politicians
Norwegian women in politics
Women members of the Storting